Joakim Nyström was the defending champion, but did not participate this year.

Emilio Sánchez won the title, defeating Ricki Osterthun 6–1, 6–3 in the final.

Seeds

  Miloslav Mečíř (quarterfinals)
  Heinz Günthardt (first round)
  Tomáš Šmíd (second round)
  Kent Carlsson (quarterfinals)
  Emilio Sánchez (champion)
  Broderick Dyke (first round)
  Sergio Casal (first round)
  Libor Pimek (second round)

Draw

Finals

Top half

Bottom half

External links
 1986 BMW Open draw

Singles